James Beall may refer to:

James Andrew Beall (1866–1929), Democratic United States congressman from Texas
J. Glenn Beall (1894–1971), Republican United States senator from Maryland
Jim Beall (California politician) (born 1952), Democratic state senator from California

See also
Lloyd James Beall (1808–1887), commandant of the Confederate States Marine Corps
 James Beale (disambiguation)